Lecil Olen "Bull" Wesley (September 26, 1901 – January 9, 1980) was an American football player. He played college football for Alabama and in the National Football League (NFL) as a center, guard, tackle, and fullback for the Providence Steam Roller (1926-1927), New York Giants (1928), and Portsmouth Spartans (1930). He appeared in 35 NFL games, 19 as a starter.

References

1901 births
1980 deaths
Alabama Crimson Tide football players
Providence Steam Roller players
New York Giants players
Portsmouth Spartans players
Players of American football from Alabama